Moose Jaw North is a provincial electoral district for the Legislative Assembly of Saskatchewan, Canada. One of two provincial constituencies for the city of Moose Jaw, the riding's southern boundary follows Caribou Street from the Trans-Canada bypass in the east to the city limits in the west.

This district was created for the 1967 election after the Saskatchewan government decided to retire a system of multiple-MLA electoral divisions for the cities of Regina, Saskatoon, and Moose Jaw.

Members of the Legislative Assembly

Election results

 

 

|-

 
|NDP
|Derek Hassen
|align="right"|2,768
|align="right"|35.88
|align="right"|-9.57
 
|Prog. Conservative
|Rick Swenson
|align="right"|283
|align="right"|3.67
|align="right"|-

|- bgcolor="white"
!align="left" colspan=3|Total
!align="right"|7,715
!align="right"|100.00
!align="right"|

|-

 
|NDP
|Glenn Hagel
|align="right"|3,927
|align="right"|45.45
|align="right"|-12.41

|- bgcolor="white"
!align="left" colspan=3|Total
!align="right"|8,640
!align="right"|100.00
!align="right"|

|-
 
| style="width: 130px" |NDP
|Glenn Hagel
|align="right"|4,580
|align="right"|57.86
|align="right"|+7.21

|- bgcolor="white"
!align="left" colspan=3|Total
!align="right"|7,916
!align="right"|100.00
!align="right"|

|-
 
| style="width: 130px" |NDP
|Glenn Hagel
|align="right"|3,451
|align="right"|50.65
|align="right"|-6.38

|- bgcolor="white"
!align="left" colspan=3|Total
!align="right"|6,814
!align="right"|100.00
!align="right"|

|-
 
| style="width: 130px" |NDP
|Glenn Hagel
|align="right"|4,067
|align="right"|57.03
|align="right"|-1.41

 
|Prog. Conservative
|John E. Langford
|align="right"|1,031
|align="right"|14.46
|align="right"|-5.29
|- bgcolor="white"
!align="left" colspan=3|Total
!align="right"|7,131
!align="right"|100.00
!align="right"|

|-
 
| style="width: 130px" |NDP
|Glenn Hagel
|align="right"|5,681
|align="right"|58.44
|align="right"|+8.09

 
|Prog. Conservative
|Colleen Basarsky
|align="right"|1,920
|align="right"|19.75
|align="right"|-20.31
|- bgcolor="white"
!align="left" colspan=3|Total
!align="right"|9,721
!align="right"|100.00
!align="right"|

|-
 
| style="width: 130px" |NDP
|Glenn Hagel
|align="right"|5,370
|align="right"|50.35
|align="right"|+12.79
 
|Prog. Conservative
|Keith Parker
|align="right"|4,273
|align="right"|40.06
|align="right"|-16.43

|- bgcolor="white"
!align="left" colspan=3|Total
!align="right"|10,666
!align="right"|100.00
!align="right"|

|-
 
| style="width: 130px" |Prog. Conservative
|Keith Parker
|align="right"|5,859
|align="right"|56.49
|align="right"|+17.01
 
|NDP
|Glenn Hagel
|align="right"|3,895
|align="right"|37.56
|align="right"|-11.89

|- bgcolor="white"
!align="left" colspan=3|Total
!align="right"|10,371
!align="right"|100.00
!align="right"|

|-
 
| style="width: 130px" |NDP
|John Skoberg
|align="right"|4,483
|align="right"|49.45
|align="right"|+6.31
 
|Prog. Conservative
|Kerry R. Chow
|align="right"|3,579
|align="right"|39.48
|align="right"|+11.04

|- bgcolor="white"
!align="left" colspan=3|Total
!align="right"|9,065
!align="right"|100.00
!align="right"|

|-
 
| style="width: 130px" |NDP
|John Skoberg
|align="right"|3,468
|align="right"|43.14
|align="right"|-4.26
 
|Prog. Conservative
|Ken Glenn
|align="right"|2,286
|align="right"|28.44
|align="right"|-

|- bgcolor="white"
!align="left" colspan=3|Total
!align="right"|8,038
!align="right"|100.00
!align="right"|

|-

 
|NDP
|Thomas Gifco
|align="right"|2,504
|align="right"|47.40
|align="right"|+4.78
|- bgcolor="white"
!align="left" colspan=3|Total
!align="right"|5,283
!align="right"|100.00
!align="right"|

|-
 
| style="width: 130px" |NDP
|Gordon Snyder
|align="right"|2,860
|align="right"|42.62
|align="right"|*

 
|Prog. Conservative
|Daniel J. Patterson
|align="right"|1,126
|align="right"|16.78
|align="right"|*
|- bgcolor="white"
!align="left" colspan=3|Total
!align="right"|6,711
!align="right"|100.00
!align="right"|

References

External links
Website of the Legislative Assembly of Saskatchewan
Saskatchewan Archives Board – Saskatchewan Election Results By Electoral Division

Moose Jaw
Saskatchewan provincial electoral districts
1967 establishments in Saskatchewan